The 3DO Blaster is an add-on produced by Creative Labs and designed to allow compatible Windows-based PCs to play games for the 3DO Interactive Multiplayer. It is a full-sized ISA compatibility card, and unlike other such add-ons, it does not emulate a 3DO system, but rather the whole system's logic board is included, with the input (controllers) and output (video & audio) redirected to the PC.

The product was marketed as a single board for CD-ROM drive owners (but only drives with a Panasonic interface) or bundled with the necessary CD-ROM drive. The software drivers allowed for Windows (3.1) based gameplay, which featured real-time stretching of the game window and screenshot capturing. As graphics boards of the time (1994) were not up to par with the system's needs, a pass-through using a VGA feature connector link was used, thus reserving an area on screen to be used by the 3DO Blaster card's output. Thus, there was no impact on the CPU. As with the first 3DO system from Panasonic (REAL FZ-1) an FMV daughter-card enabling Video CD playback was planned, but since the 3DO Blaster failed to achieve momentum, it was never released. Saved games were stored in NVRAM on the card.

Bundle contents
The card was sold with the cables needed, a 3DO controller by Logitech, and two 3DO games on CD: Shock Wave from Electronic Arts and Gridders from Tetragon. Despite showing the 'long boxes' of the two games on the back of the packing box, they were included in jewel cases only. A third CD, containing demos of popular 3DO games was also included. Not included was software from Aldus; Aldus Photostyler SE and Aldus Gallery Effects Vol. 1, but pictures of both titles can be seen on the back of the 3DO Blaster packing box.

Hardware requirements
 Intel or compatible PC with 80386 CPU and Microsoft Windows
 Any of these Sound Blaster cards: Sound Blaster Pro, Sound Blaster 16 or Sound Blaster AWE32
 A CD-ROM drive with a Panasonic interface
 A free ISA slot
 A VGA graphics card with VGA feature connector

See also
 3DO
 Creative Labs

References

CREATIVE LABS. 3DO BLASTER CARD, The Strange (and Rare) Videogame Pics Page, 1998-2001 of Fabrizio Pedrazzini

External links
Ausretrogamer Retrospective: The Creative 3DO Blaster

3DO Interactive Multiplayer
Compatibility cards
Creative Technology products
IBM PC compatibles